In the UEFA Women's Championship, the following female players have been named in the national team in at least five finals tournaments.

Tournaments

Matches
The following players had caps in at least 15 matches, which requires a minimum of three Championship appearances.

References

UEFA Women's Championship